Ciara Peelo (born 1 October 1979) is an Irish sailor. Born in Dublin, Ireland, Peelo represented Ireland at the 2008 Summer Olympics in the women's Laser Radial class, where she finished 20th. She was the Irish flagbearer during the 2008 Summer Olympics opening ceremony in Beijing.

References

1979 births
Living people
Olympic sailors of Ireland
Irish female sailors (sport)
Sportspeople from Dublin (city)
Sailors at the 2008 Summer Olympics – Laser Radial